Brett Banasiewicz (born September 26, 1994), nicknamed "Mad Dog", is an American professional BMX rider living in South Bend, Indiana. He became a professional BMX rider at the age of 13. In the 2010, 2011, and 2012 Brett competed in the BMX park discipline at the X Games finishing 4th, 7th and 4th respectively. On August 23, 2012, he crashed in a practice session at the Vans LXVI BMX Invitational at Virginia Beach, Virginia suffering a head injury. He spent 15 days in a medically induced coma whilst being treated at Sentara Princess Anne Hospital (Virginia Beach, VA).

Brett also has a cousin who is a famous BMX rider: Hannah Roberts.

Contest history 

2012
4th BMX Worlds, BMX Dirt
1st Dew Tour, Ocean City, BMX Park
1st ASA Big-Air BMX Triples Orange County
3rd FISE Costa Rica, BMX Park
1st FISE Montpellier, BMX Park
1st FISE Montpellier, BMX Dirt
2011
4th Dew tour Cup, BMX Dirt
3rd Air in the Square, MegaRamp ASA Triples
2nd Telekom Extreme Playgrounds, BMX Dirt
2nd Telekom Extreme Playgrounds, BMX Park
2nd BMX Masters, BMX Spine Ramp
 4th Dew Tour Las Vegas, BMX Dirt
4th Dew Tour Salk Lake City, BMX Dirt
4th Simpel Session, BMX Park
 2010
4th X Games 2010, BMX Park
 2nd Dew Cup 2010, BMX Dirt
 3rd Dew Tour 2010 Salt Lake City, BMX Dirt
 2nd Dew Tour 2010 Portland, BMX Park
 1st Dew Tour 2010 Portland, BMX Dirt
 1st Dew Tour 2010 Chicago, BMX Dirt
 1st BMX Masters 2010 Cologne, BMX Park
 2nd BMX Masters 2010 Cologne, BMX Dirt
 1st Box Jump ASA BMX Triples
 3rd FISE Montpellier, BMX Park
 4th FISE Montpellier, BMX Dirt
 3rd JOMOPRO, BMX Park
1st T-Mobile Extreme Playgrounds, BMX Park
2nd Toronto BMX Jam, BMX Park
4th Nike 6.0 BMX Pro Barcelona, BMX Park
4th Nike 6.0 BMX Pro Huntington Beach, BMX Park
2nd Simpel Session, BMX Park
1st DK Dirt Circuit, BMX Dirt
 2009
 2nd Mini-Ramp, BMX World Championships
 3rd JOMOPRO, BMX Park

References

External links
 ESPN Profile
 Alli Profile

1994 births
Living people
X Games athletes
American male cyclists
Place of birth missing (living people)
Cyclists from Indiana
BMX riders